Daniel Fournier is a Canadian politician and businessperson.

Daniel Fournier may also refer to:
Daniel Fournier (Liberal candidate)
Daniel Fournier (engraver)